Beef House is an American comedy television series created by and starring Tim Heidecker and Eric Wareheim. The series premiered on Adult Swim on March 30, 2020. The series is a parody of 1980s and 1990s American family sitcoms, featuring Wareheim and Jamie-Lynn Sigler as a married suburban couple who live with the former's best friend (Heidecker) and a trio of eccentric men.

On January 1, 2021, Tim and Eric hosted a watch-along of Tim and Eric's Billion Dollar Movie. As part of it, they mentioned that they had already written a second season of Beef House, but that any potential production would be delayed indefinitely due to the COVID-19 pandemic. On August 8, 2021, Heidecker announced that although scripts have been written, Adult Swim has no plans in renewing the series for a second season.

Premise

Eric Wareheim plays "Eric," a put-upon suburbanite who is married to Detective Megan (Sigler), a high-strung police detective with whom he shares a largely one-sided and acrimonious relationship characterized by her openly expressing her disdain for him and her attraction to other men. Living with Eric are his best friend, "Tim" (Heidecker), an Army veteran and aspiring rock musician, and a trio of middle-aged to elderly men: Ron Austar, Tennessee Luke, and Ben Hur. Each episode functions as a parody of the conventions of the traditional American family sitcom, beginning with traditional plotlines and story setups (such as an old friend coming to visit or trying to impress a neighbor) that are subverted as the episodes descend into absurdity and chaos.

Cast
Tim Heidecker as Tim
Eric Wareheim as Eric
Jamie-Lynn Sigler as Detective Megan Dungerson 
Ron Austar as Ron
Tennessee Winston Luke as Tennessee Luke
Ben Hur as Ben Hur
Kannon Hicks as Boro 
Devin Mills as Lana
Michael Bowen as Brad
Beth Grant as Eric's Mother

Episodes

Critical reception
Reviewing series premiere "Army Buddy Brad", Randall Colburn of The A.V. Club gave the episode an A−, praising the aesthetic and its storytelling for capturing the absurdity of 1990s American family sitcoms.

References

Notes

External links
 

2020 American television series debuts
2020 American television series endings
2020s American comedy television series
2020s American parody television series
English-language television shows
Adult Swim original programming
Television series by Abso Lutely Productions
Television series by Williams Street
Television series set in 2020
Television shows set in Florida